Let's Dance 2012 was the seventh season of the Swedish version of Strictly Come Dancing, and was broadcast on the Swedish television channel TV4 starting on 30 March 2012.

Couples

Scoring Chart

Red numbers indicate the lowest score for each week.
Green numbers indicate the highest score for each week.
 indicates the couple eliminated that week.
 indicates the returning couple that finished in the bottom two.
 indicates the winning couple.
 indicates the runner-up couple.
 indicates the third place couple.

 The first week did not eliminate any couple, instead it was announced who was in the bottom two going into Week 2.
 Since Week 1 was a non-elimination week, Week 2 featured a combined score of both Week 1 and 2, which was used in the final standings.

Average chart

Average dance chart

Highest and lowest scoring performances 
The best and worst performances in each dance according to the judges' marks are as follows:

Dance schedule
The celebrities and professional partners danced one of these routines for each corresponding week.

Week 1: Cha-Cha-Cha or Waltz
Week 2: Rumba or Quickstep
Week 3: One Unlearned Dance
Week 4: Samba
Week 5: One Unlearned Dance & Group Viennese Waltz
Week 6: One Unlearned Dance & Rock 'n' Roll Marathon
Week 7: One Unlearned Dance & Salsa Marathon (Movie Week)
Week 8: One Unlearned Dance & Bugg
Week 9: Final Unlearned Dance & Judges' Redemption Dance
Week 10: Couple's Favorite Ballroom Dance, Couple's Favorite Latin Dance & Showdance

Songs

Week 1
Individual judges scores in charts below (given in parentheses) are listed in this order from left to right: Dermot Clemenger, Ann Wilson and Tony Irving.

Running order

Week 2

Individual judges scores in charts below (given in parentheses) are listed in this order from left to right: Dermot Clemenger, Ann Wilson and Tony Irving.

Running order

Week 3

Individual judges scores in charts below (given in parentheses) are listed in this order from left to right: Dermot Clemenger, Ann Wilson and Tony Irving.

Running order

Week 4

Individual judges scores in charts below (given in parentheses) are listed in this order from left to right: Dermot Clemenger, Ann Wilson and Tony Irving.

Running order

Week 5

Individual judges scores in charts below (given in parentheses) are listed in this order from left to right: Dermot Clemenger, Ann Wilson and Tony Irving.

Running order

Week 6

Individual judges scores in charts below (given in parentheses) are listed in this order from left to right: Dermot Clemenger, Ann Wilson and Tony Irving.

Running order

Week 7

Individual judges scores in charts below (given in parentheses) are listed in this order from left to right: Dermot Clemenger, Ann Wilson and Tony Irving.

Running order

Week 8

Individual judges scores in charts below (given in parentheses) are listed in this order from left to right: Dermot Clemenger, Ann Wilson and Tony Irving.

Running order

Week 9

Individual judges scores in charts below (given in parentheses) are listed in this order from left to right: Dermot Clemenger, Ann Wilson and Tony Irving.

Running order

Week 10

Individual judges scores in charts below (given in parentheses) are listed in this order from left to right: Dermot Clemenger, Ann Wilson and Tony Irving.

Running order

Dance Chart

 Highest Scoring Dance
 Lowest Scoring Dance
 Dances performed at the finale by previously eliminated celebrities

External links
Official website of Let's Dance (Swedish)

2012
TV4 (Sweden) original programming
2012 Swedish television seasons